This article is about the particular significance of the year 1978 to Wales and its people.

Incumbents

Secretary of State for Wales – John Morris
Archbishop of Wales – Gwilym Williams, Bishop of Bangor
Archdruid of the National Eisteddfod of Wales
Bryn (outgoing)
Geraint (Bowen) (incoming)

Events
March/April - Closure of the steelworks in Ebbw Vale and East Moors.
unknown dates
The Welsh Office is given responsibility for further and higher education in Wales.
The National Language Centre is established at Nant Gwrtheyrn in the Lleyn peninsula.

Arts and literature
Richard Burton records the narrative for the concept album Jeff Wayne's Musical Version of The War of the Worlds.
Operatic contralto Helen Watts is appointed a CBE.
Gregynog Press is reincarnated as "Gwasg Gregynog".

Awards
National Eisteddfod of Wales (held in Cardiff)
National Eisteddfod of Wales: Chair - withheld
National Eisteddfod of Wales: Crown - Siôn Eirian
National Eisteddfod of Wales: Prose Medal - Harri Williams

New books

English language
Ruth Bidgood - The Print of Miracle
Ken Follett - Eye of the Needle
James Hanley - A Kingdom
Robert Minhinnick - A Thread in the Maze
John Tripp - Collected Poems
Gwyn A. Williams - The Merthyr Rising

Welsh language
Marion Eames - I Hela Cnau
Gwyn Thomas - Croesi Traeth
T. Arfon Williams - Englynion Arfon

Music
Dave Edmunds - Tracks on Wax 4
Geraint Jarman - Hen Wlad Fy Nhadau

Film
Kenneth Griffith appears with Richard Burton in The Wild Geese.

Broadcasting

Welsh-language television
Shane becomes the first film to be dubbed into the Welsh language for television.

English-language television
17 March - BBC Wales comedy film Grand Slam stars Hugh Griffith and Windsor Davies.
BBC Wales drama serial Hawkmoor, based on the life of Twm Siôn Cati, stars John Ogwen and Jane Asher.
Elaine Morgan's adaptation of Off to Philadelphia in the Morning, the novel by Jack Jones, stars David Lyn as Joseph Parry and Connie Booth as his wife, Jane. Meredith Edwards, Rachel Thomas and William Squire also appear.

English-language radio
13 November - BBC Radio Wales is launched, following the demise of the 'Radio 4 Wales' service (previously the Welsh Home Service). The first show is AM, presented by Anita Morgan.

Sport
BBC Wales Sports Personality of the Year – Johnny Owen
Boxing – Johnny Owen wins the Commonwealth bantamweight title.
Darts – Leighton Rees wins the World Professional Darts Championship.
Rugby union – Wales win their eighth Grand Slam.
Snooker
29 April – Ray Reardon wins the World Championship for the sixth time.
1 December – Doug Mountjoy wins the UK Snooker Championship in Preston.

Births
21 January - Rachael Bland, née Hodges, broadcast journalist (died 2018)
1 February - David Hughes, footballer
12 February - Gethin Jones, television presenter
26 July - Eve Myles, actress
2 September - Matthew Watkins, rugby union player (died 2020)
17 November - Tom Ellis, actor
25 December - Simon Jones, cricketer
date unknown
David Llewellyn, fiction writer
Rachel Trezise, fiction writer

Deaths
6 January - Ted Jones, trade union leader, 81
11 January - William John Edwards, Cerdd Dant singer, 79
17 February - Joseph Owen, cricketer, 69
20 February - Tom Jones, footballer, 88
23 February - Arwyn Davies, Baron Arwyn, politician, 80
24 February - David Williams, historian, 78 
2 March - Frances Williams, composer, 
6 March - David Price-White, lawyer and politician, 71
4 April - Sir Morien Morgan, aeronautics engineer, 65
9 April - Sir Clough Williams-Ellis, architect, 94
13 April - William Rees-Thomas, psychiatrist, 90
14 April - Thomas Hollingdale, Wales rugby union international, 77
16 April - Eddie Morgan, Wales international rugby player, 64
25 April - Harry Griffiths, footballer and manager, 47
18 May - Selwyn Lloyd, politician, 73
2 July - Philip Scott Yorke, last Squire of Erddig, 73
21 August - Rhys Davies, 76, novelist and short story writer
25 August - Tyssul Griffiths, rugby player, 59
4 September – Leonora Cohen, suffragette, trade unionist and feminist, 105
12 September - Bobby Delahay, Wales rugby union captain, 78
13 November - W. S. Gwynn Williams, composer, 82
23 November - Edward Jones, 82, cricketer 
16 December - Harry Phillips, Wales international rugby player, 75

See also
1978 in Northern Ireland

References

Wales
 Wales